Golčův Jeníkov is a town in Havlíčkův Brod District in the Vysočina Region of the Czech Republic. It has about 2,700 inhabitants.

Administrative parts
Villages of Kobylí Hlava, Nasavrky, Římovice, Sirákovice, Stupárovice and Vrtěšice are administrative parts of Golčův Jeníkov.

Geography
It lies in the Upper Sázava Hills.

History

The first written mention of Jeníkov is in a letter from the Olomouc Bishop Henry Zdík not older than from 1150. The settlement was probably founded in the 10th century. The next mention of Jeníkov is in the list of the Prague Diocese from 1344–1350. The first mentions of surrounding villages, now parts of Golčův Jeníkov, are from the 14th century; Podmoky was mentioned in 1360, a fortress in Římovice in 1372, and Kobylí Hlava in 1391.

At the beginning of the 14th century, the first Jews settled in the village. At the and of the 14th century, Jeníkov was owned by the Chlum family and then briefly the Podhořany family. In 1417, Jeníkov is first referred to as a market town. During the Hussite Wars, it was a centre of the insurgency. From 1468 until 1580, Jeníkov was almost continuously owned by the Slavata of Chlum and Košumberk family.

During the 16th century, crafts and trade were developed. The Jeníkov manor became rich and prospered. In 1580, Václav Robmháp of Suchá and from Seč bought Jeníkov and the neighbouring manor of Zábělčice manor and merged them.

During the Thirty Years' War, Jeníkov was burned several times, for the first time by the troops of General Charles Bonaventure, Count of Bucquoy in 1619 and last time by the army of General Johan Banér. From 1632 to 1636, Jeníkov manor was owned by Jan Rudolf Trčka of Lípa. In 1636, the manor was given to General Martin Maxmillian of Goltz by the Emperor as a reward for services.

During the rule of General Goltz and his wife, Jeníkov was rebuilt and improved. A significant part of theirs activities was motivated by the effort to re-Catholicize the Utraquist manor. Goltz had the stone town hall, tower fortress, Loreta chapel and deanery built. In 1640, he had the Church of the Holy Cross rebuilt and consecrated it to the Virgin Mary. Goltz later also invited the Jesuits to Jeníkov and had started construction of the Jesuit college, finished after his death in 1653 by his wife. For his contribution to the market town, it became known as Golčův Jeníkov.

After Goltz and four years later his wife died without offspring, they inherited Golčův Jeníkov to their nephew Johann Dietrich of Ledebour possession with order to build a bell tower and give 1,000 guilders to the Jesuits every year. After failing the will and losing the lawsuit in 1672, he was forced to sell the manor to Countess Barbara Eusebia Caretto-Millesimo.

In 1766, Golčův Jeníkov was acquired by Filip Kolowrat-Krakowsky. His son Leopold Kolowrat-Krakowsky converted the old castle to a tobacco factory. He also founded here the first needle factory in Europe and introduced the cultivation of alfalfa, clover and potatoes. In 1773, he received confiscated property of Jesuits from Maria Theresa. On 21 October 1784, half of the market town was destroyed by a fire, including Loreta chapel and deanery.

A hereditary dispute broke out, which lasted until 1817 and brought Golčův Jeníkov to decline. The needle factory was closed and the tobacco factory was moved to Sedlec. In 1817, Kolowrat's daughter Louise von Herberstein eventually bought the manor. Her property was inherited by under-age minor son and the manor was administered by his trustee Hugo von Eger. He founded the Church of Saint Francis of Assissi, had the former tobacco factory rebuilt into a castle, and founded an English style park.

After the abolishment of serfdom in 1848, Golčův Jeníkov became an independent municipality. On 13 February 1913, Golčův Jeníkov was promoted to a town.

Transport

Golčův Jeníkov lies on the railway from Kolín to Havlíčkův Brod. It is served by two railway stations: Golčův Jeníkov and Golčův Jeníkov město.

Sights

The most valuable monuments include Church of Saint Francis of Assissi, Goltz Fortress, and the castle complex with Old Castle and New Castle buildings.

The Jewish community is commemorated by the former synagogue and Jewish cemetery. The synagogue was first documented in 1659. After it was destroyed by a fire in 1871, the new synagogue was built in 1873. Today it is owned by the Jewish Community in Prague and used as depository of the Jewish Museum in Prague. The cemetery is one of the oldest in Bohemia. It is  large and was founded probably in the 14th century. The oldest preserved readable tombstone is from 1705.

Notable people
Zsigmond Kornfeld (1852–1909), Hungarian banker and baron
Friedrich Weleminsky (1868–1945), physician, scientist and microbiologist
Zbyněk Šidák (1933–1999), mathematician
Jarmila Kratochvílová (born 1951), track and field athlete

References

External links

 

Cities and towns in the Czech Republic
Populated places in Havlíčkův Brod District
Shtetls